The tomb of Sikandar Shah, also known as Sikandar Shah's Rauza, is a mausoleum built by Gujarat Sultan Mahmud Begada in honour of his soldier Sikandar Shah in  at Prantij, Gujarat, India.

History 

The epitaph reads that "the greatest Rai and the magnificent Khan" Sikandar Khan, son of Giyath, son of Umar, son Muhammad, son of Soomra chief Duda was killed on 21st Safar Hijri year 885 (2 May 1480) at Thana (outpost) Sinher or Sembhar at the age of 32 during the reign of Mahmud Shah I (Mahmud Begada).

According to a legend, Mian Sikandar was a soldier in an army of Ahmad Shah I. He died in a battle at Halvad with the chief of Dhrangadhra State. As he was native of Prantij, he was buried here. Later his name was sanctified from Mian to Shah.

The tomb is the Monument of National Importance (N-GJ-175).

Architecture 
The mausoleum is a rectangular building without a dome which has been replaced with fibre-reinforced plastic dome during the later restoration.

References 

Tourist attractions in Gujarat
Tombs in India
Mausoleums in Gujarat
Monuments of National Importance in Gujarat
Buildings and structures completed in 1480